Ante Mandić (2 June 1881 – 15 September 1959) was a lawyer and Croatian and Yugoslavian politician. During World War I, as a representative of the Yugoslav Committee in Saint Petersburg from 1915, he organised a Yugoslav volunteer detachment in Odessa. He moved to London in 1917 to work as the secretary of the central office of the Yugoslav Committee in London. After returning to the newly-formed (1918) Kingdom of Serbs, Croats and Slovenes (later renamed "Yugoslavia" in 1929), Mandić pursued a career in law. After the September 1943 surrender of Italy in World War II Mandić allied himself with the Yugoslav Partisans and was appointed the president of the National Liberation Committee in Opatija, a delegate to the State Anti-fascist Council for the National Liberation of Croatia (ZAVNOH). He was elected as a member of the Anti-Fascist Council for the National Liberation of Yugoslavia (AVNOJ) presidency. A year later, in 1944, he was appointed the head of the district National Liberation Committee for Istria and the Federal State of Croatia's Commission for War Crimes. In March–November 1945, Mandić was  a member of the royal regency council under the Tito–Šubašić Agreements of 1944-1945.

References

1881 births
1959 deaths
Croatian people of World War II
Politicians from Trieste
People from Austrian Littoral
Regents
Croatian lawyers
Croatian politicians